The Syzran Bridge across the Volga River near Syzran, was designed by Nikolai Belelubsky and Konstantin Mikhailovsky. It was the first rail bridge across the Volga in its lower reaches. Opened by Konstantin Posyet in 1880 as a part of the Samara-Zlatoust Railway.

Initially, the bridge was called Alexandrovsky commemorating the 25th anniversary of the reign of the emperor Alexander II of Russia. After the October revolution, the bridge was renamed in Syzransky.

In 1918, during the Russian Civil War, two spans of the bridge were detonated by the retreating troops of Komuch supporters, but were quickly restored. 

After the Soviet collapse, the bridge received back its old name, the "new" still remained. Thus, the bridge has two names (Alexandrovsky and Syzransky).

In 1949, the decision on creation of a second track on the bridge was accepted, the building of which was completed in 1957.

In 1980, the tanker "Volgoneft 268" crashed into the bridge, but the damage turned out to be not serious.

In 2004, a total renovation of the bridge was completed, during which the original spans were replaced with new ones.

On August 27, 2010, a commemorative stele was set up on the occasion of the 130th anniversary of the bridge's opening.

External links 
 

Railway bridges in Russia
Truss bridges
Bridges completed in 1880
Buildings and structures in Samara Oblast
Bridges across the Volga River
Rail transport in Samara Oblast